Foxbite is the debut album by Icelandic band Mr. Silla & Mongoose. It was released in the days after Iceland Airwaves 2007.

Track listing
 "Gua" — 2:49
 "Noodlefeet" — 3:10
 "Raggedypack" — 4:23
 "I Don't" — 3:47
 "Wanna Million" — 3:16
 "How do you" — 4:22
 "Ten Foot Bear" — 5:40
 "Save It For Later" — 4:18
 "The Devil Has A Prosthetic Leg" — 1:09
 "Foxbyte" — 3:41
 "I've Been Hit" — 4:00
 "Do Not Know" — 3:44
 "I Only Want Chicken" — 4:55
 "Say" — 1:22
 "Organ Deviltry" — 3:22

Personnel
Magnús Trygvason Eliassen — drums on track 7, 10, 13 and 15.
James SK Wān — kazoo on track 8 and 14.
Eiríkur Orri Ólafsson – brass on track 15.

References

Mr. Silla & Mongoose albums
2007 debut albums